This is a list of electoral divisions and wards in the ceremonial county of Devon in South West England. All changes since the re-organisation of local government following the passing of the Local Government Act 1972 are shown. The number of councillors elected for each electoral division or ward is shown in brackets.

County council

Devon
Electoral Divisions from 1 April 1974 (first election 12 April 1973) to 2 May 1985:

Electoral Divisions from 2 May 1985 to 5 May 2005:

Electoral Divisions from 5 May 2005 to 4 May 2017:

† minor boundary changes in 2009 ‡ minor boundary changes in 2013

Electoral Divisions from 4 May 2017 to present:

Unitary authority councils

Plymouth
Wards from 1 April 1974 (first election 7 June 1973) to 3 May 1979:

Wards from 3 May 1979 to 1 May 2003:

Wards from 1 May 2003 to present:

Torbay
Wards from 1 April 1974 (first election 7 June 1973) to 5 May 1983:

Wards from 5 May 1983 to 1 May 2003:

Wards from 1 May 2003 to 2 May 2019:

Wards from 2 May 2019 to present:

District councils

East Devon
Wards from 1 April 1974 (first election 7 June 1973) to 3 May 1979:

Wards from 3 May 1979 to 1 May 2003:

Wards from 1 May 2003 to 2 May 2019:

Wards from 2 May 2019 to present:

Exeter
Wards from 1 April 1974 (first election 7 June 1973) to 5 May 1983:

Wards from 5 May 1983 to 4 May 2000:

Wards from 4 May 2000 to 5 May 2016:

Wards from 5 May 2016 to present:

Mid Devon
Wards from 1 April 1974 (first election 7 June 1973) to 3 May 1979:

Wards from 3 May 1979 to 1 May 2003:

Wards from 1 May 2003 to 2023:

Wards from 2023:

North Devon
Wards from 1 April 1974 (first election 7 June 1973) to 5 May 1983:

Wards from 5 May 1983 to 1 May 2003:

Wards from 1 May 2003 to 2 May 2019:

† minor boundary changes in 2007
‡ minor boundary changes in 2015

Wards from 2 May 2019 to present:

South Hams
Wards from 1 April 1974 (first election 7 June 1973) to 3 May 1979:

Wards from 3 May 1979 to 6 May 1999:

Wards from 6 May 1999 to 7 May 2015:

Wards from 7 May 2015 to present:

Teignbridge
Wards from 1 April 1974 (first election 7 June 1973) to 3 May 1979:

Wards from 3 May 1979 to 1 May 2003:

Wards from 1 May 2003 to 2 May 2019:

† minor boundary changes in 2011

Wards from 2 May 2019 to present:

Torridge
Wards from 1 April 1974 (first election 7 June 1973) to 3 May 1979:

Wards from 3 May 1979 to 1 May 2003:

Wards from 1 May 2003 to 2 May 2019:

Wards from 2 May 2019 to present:

West Devon
Wards from 1 April 1974 (first election 7 June 1973) to 3 May 1979:

Wards from 3 May 1979 to 1 May 2003:

Wards from 1 May 2003 to 7 May 2015:

Wards from 7 May 2015 to present:

Electoral wards by constituency

Central Devon
Ashburton and Buckfastleigh, Boniface, Bovey, Bradninch, Cadbury, Chagford, Chudleigh, Drewsteignton, Exbourne, Exe Valley, Hatherleigh, Haytor, Kenn Valley, Lawrence, Lew Valley, Moorland, Newbrooke, North Tawton, Okehampton East, Okehampton West, Sandford and Creedy, Silverton, South Tawton, Taw, Taw Vale, Teignbridge North, Teign Valley, Upper Yeo, Way, Yeo.

East Devon
Broadclyst, Budleigh, Clyst Valley, Exmouth Brixington, Exmouth Halsdon, Exmouth Littleham, Exmouth Town, Exmouth Withycombe Raleigh, Newton Poppleford and Harpford, Ottery St Mary Rural, Ottery St Mary Town, Raleigh, Sidmouth Rural, Sidmouth Sidford, Sidmouth Town, St Loyes, Topsham, Whimple, Woodbury and Lympstone.

Exeter
Alphington, Cowick, Duryard, Exwick, Heavitree, Mincinglake, Newtown, Pennsylvania, Pinhoe, Polsloe, Priory, St David’s, St James, St Leonard’s, St Thomas, Whipton & Barton.

Newton Abbot
Ambrook, Bishopsteignton, Bradley, Buckland and Milber, Bushell, College, Dawlish Central and North East, Dawlish South West, Ipplepen, Kenton with Starcross, Kerswell-with-Combe, Kingsteignton East, Kingsteignton West, Shaldon and Stokeinteignhead, Teignmouth Central, Teignmouth East, Teignmouth West.

North Devon
Bickington and Roundswell, Bishop’s Nympton, Bratton Fleming, Braunton East, Braunton West, Central Town, Chittlehampton, Chulmleigh, Combe Martin, Forches and Whiddon Valley, Fremington, Georgeham and Mortehoe, Heanton Punchardon, Ilfracombe Central, Ilfracombe East, Ilfracombe West, Instow, Landkey, Swimbridge and Taw, Longbridge, Lynton and Lynmouth, Marwood, Newport, North Molton, Pilton, South Molton, Witheridge, Yeo Valley.

Plymouth, Moor View
Budshead, Eggbuckland, Ham, Honicknowle, Moor View, St Budeaux, Southway.

Plymouth, Sutton and Devonport
Compton, Devonport, Drake, Efford and Lipson, Peverell, St Peter and the Waterfront, Stoke, Sutton and Mount Gould.

South West Devon
Bickleigh and Shaugh, Charterlands, Cornwood and Sparkwell, Erme Valley, Ivybridge Central, Ivybridge Filham, Ivybridge Woodlands, Plympton Chaddlewood, Plympton Erle, Plympton St Mary, Plymstock Dunstone, Plymstock Radford, Newton and Noss, Wembury and Brixton, Yealmpton.

Tiverton and Honiton
Axminster Rural, Axminster Town, Beer and Branscombe, Canonsleigh, Castle, Clare and Shuttern, Coly Valley, Cranmore, Cullompton North, Cullompton Outer, Cullompton South, Dunkeswell, Feniton and Buckerell, Halberton, Honiton St Michael’s, Honiton St Paul’s, Lower Culm, Lowman, Newbridges, Otterhead, Seaton, Tale Vale, Trinity, Upper Culm, Westexe, Yarty.

Torbay
Clifton-with-Maidenway, Cockington-with-Chelston, Ellacombe, Goodrington-with-Roselands, Preston, Roundham-with-Hyde, St Marychurch, Shiphay-with-the-Willows, Tormohun, Watcombe, Wellswood.

Torridge and West Devon
Appledore, Bere Ferrers, Bideford East, Bideford North, Bideford South, Bridestowe, Broadheath, Buckland Monachorum, Burrator, Clinton, Clovelly Bay, Coham Bridge, Forest, Hartland and Bradworthy, Holsworthy, Kenwith, Lydford, Mary Tavy, Milton Ford, Monkleigh and Littleham, Northam, Orchard Hill, Shebbear and Langtree, Tamarside, Tavistock North, Tavistock South, Tavistock South West, Three Moors, Thrushel, Torrington, Two Rivers, Waldon, Walkham, Westward Ho!, Winkleigh.

Totnes
Allington and Loddiswell, Avon and Harbourne, Berry Head-with-Furzeham, Blatchcombe, Churston-with-Galmpton,  Dartington, Dartmouth and Kingswear, Dartmouth Townstal, East Dart, Eastmoor, Kingsbridge East, Kingsbridge North, Marldon, Salcombe and Malborough, Saltstone, Skerries, South Brent, St Mary’s-with-Summercombe, Stokenham, Thurlestone, Totnes Bridgetown, Totnes Town, West Dart, Westville and Alvington.

See also
List of parliamentary constituencies in Devon

References

 
Devon
Wards